Jean-Baptiste "Jack" Laviolette (July 17, 1879 – January 10, 1960) was a Canadian professional ice hockey player. Laviolette played nine seasons for the Montreal Canadiens hockey club and was their first captain, coach, and general manager.

Laviolette was one of the first francophone stars of ice hockey. He was born in Belleville, Ontario, but grew up in Valleyfield, Quebec. He was a solid scorer from the defenceman position, but Laviolette's true place in hockey history has less to do with his scoring prowess and more to do with his role as a founding organizer of the Canadiens hockey club. He was their first player, coach and general manager in their inaugural 1910 season.

With the formation of the National Hockey Association (NHA) in December 1909, (replaced 7 years later by the NHL), team/league owner Ambrose O'Brien asked Laviolette to put together a team made up of French Canadian players to play as the "Les Canadiens" franchise in Montreal. Laviolette completed the task in time for the NHA's inaugural season. Among those that would sign on to that first team would be future hall of famers Newsy Lalonde, Didier Pitre and the "Chicoutimi Cucumber," Georges Vezina. The team he built would go on to be the most successful franchise in professional hockey.

Playing career
Laviolette first played elite-level senior men's amateur hockey in 1904 for the Montreal Le National, famous for being one of the first men's teams composed of francophones. From 1905 onward, he played as a professional, first with the Michigan Soo Indians of the International Professional Hockey League for three seasons, and then returned to Montreal to play for Montreal Shamrocks in the 1908 and 1909 seasons. A teammate of Laviolette on all of those teams was forward Didier Pitre.

He then starred for the new Montreal Canadiens franchise from 1910 until 1918, both in the NHA and the NHL, scoring 51 goals in 156 games, winning the Stanley Cup in 1916.

Laviolette lost his right foot in an automobile accident on May 1, 1918, ending his playing career. A benefit game for Laviolette was arranged at the Mount Royal Arena in 1921. He was the guest of honour, and also refereed.

Playing style

Primarily a  defenceman position wise, Laviolette was renowned for his strong skating and his marvelous speed, which helped dub the Montreal Canadiens team The Flying Frenchmen. He would occasionally also play as a forward.

Player, coach and executive Lester Patrick, who was a contemporary player of Laviolette and later a coach in the NHL with the New York Rangers, claimed that Laviolette could skate as fast backwards as most other players could skate forward. On the other hand, despite Laviolette having solid goal scoring upside both as a defenceman and as a forward, Patrick also claimed that Laviolette "lacked a sense of direction" to his game, which he claimed hindered him from reaching the superstar status of his fellow Montreal teammates Didier Pitre and Newsy Lalonde.

Laviolette was known as a clean and gentlemanly player, both in hockey and on the lacrosse field, which combined with his genial disposition on and off the sport venues made him a popular character in the various sport circuits. Outside of hockey and lacrosse, his fascination for speed also brought his attention to motorcycle racing and flying machines.

Career statistics

* Stanley Cup Champion.

Awards and achievements
 1904–05, 06–07 – First All-Star Right Wing, IPHL
 1915–16 – Stanley Cup champion
 1960 – Inducted into Canada's Sports Hall of Fame
 1963 – Inducted into the Hockey Hall of Fame

References

General

External links

1879 births
1960 deaths
Canadian amputees
Canadian ice hockey coaches
Canadian ice hockey defencemen
Franco-Ontarian people
Hockey Hall of Fame inductees
Ice hockey people from Ontario
Michigan Soo Indians players
Montreal Canadiens (NHA) players
Montreal Canadiens coaches
Montreal Canadiens players
Sportspeople from Belleville, Ontario
Stanley Cup champions